John Williams ( – 1789) was a planter and an American Revolutionary from Pitt County, North Carolina. He was the son of a Welsh immigrant, and served on the county Committee of Correspondence. He represented his county in the North Carolina provisional Assembly of 1777 as well as the state's House of Commons in 1778 and 1779.

Members of the North Carolina House of Representatives
Farmers from North Carolina
1735 births
1789 deaths
American planters
People from Pitt County, North Carolina
People of colonial North Carolina
18th-century American politicians